Big Brother Bluff is a high, angular granite bluff,  high, along the west wall of Daniels Range,  north of Mount Burnham, in the Usarp Mountains. Hence the reminiscence from George Orwell's famous saying from Nineteen Eighty-Four, "Big Brother is watching you".

See also 
Fikkan Peak

References 

Cliffs of Oates Land